The 1978 Illinois gubernatorial election were held in Illinois in November 7, 1978. Republican James R. Thompson easily won a second term in office, defeating Democrat nominee Michael Bakalis by nearly 600,000 votes.

Election information
This was the first Illinois gubernatorial election that took place during the United States' midterm elections. The previous election had been in 1976.

The primary (held March 21) and general election coincided with those for federal offices (Senate and House) and those for other state offices. The election was part of the 1978 Illinois elections.

Turnout
Turnout in the primaries saw 20.39% in the gubernatorial primaries, with a total of 1,201,603 votes cast, and 16.33% in the lieutenant gubernatorial primary, with 962,288 votes cast.

Turnout during the general election was 54.23%, with 3,150,107 votes cast.

Democratic primary

Governor
Incumbent Illinois Comptroller Michael Bakalis won the Democratic primary.

Bakalis' opponent had been Dakin Williams, a prosecutor who was the younger brother of famous playwright Tennessee Williams. Williams had been a candidate for the Democratic nomination of Illinois' US Senate seat in 1972, and had unsuccessfully sought the nomination for the state's other US Senate seat in 1974.

Lieutenant Governor 
Lawyer Dick Durbin won the Democratic primary for lieutenant governor, running unopposed.

Republican primary

Governor 
Incumbent governor James R. Thompson won renomination, running unopposed.

Lieutenant Governor
Incumbent lieutenant governor Dave O'Neal won renomination, running unopposed.

Results

References

1978
Gubernatorial
Illinois
November 1978 events in the United States